Anguis graeca, the Greek slow worm, is a species of lizard in the family Anguidae found in Greece, Albania, and North Macedonia.  It engages in death feigning behavior when threatened.

References

Anguis
Reptiles described in 1881
Lizards of Europe
Taxa named by Jacques von Bedriaga
Taxobox binomials not recognized by IUCN 
 Legless lizards